Monee Reservoir, located at 27341 Ridgeland Avenue, Monee, Illinois, is part of the Forest Preserve District of Will County."

Geography

The 255-acre forest preserve contains a 46-acre (190,000 m2) reservoir lake. The terrain within the preserve is mostly flat, but contains a variety of ecosystems. It is mostly forest around the lake, but has scattered prairies. There are also many small marshes within the park, attracting many wetland species. The lake itself is shaped in an irregular way with many coves spurring out from it.

Recreation

The preserve is open to the public daily. The lake provides boating and fishing opportunities. The reservoir is stocked with a variety of fish including Largemouth Bass, Channel Catfish, and Northern Pike. The preserve also features hiking trails, rentable picnic areas, and a concessions building which sells bait, Illinois fishing licenses, and snacks. Boats, fishing poles, and games can also be rented from the concessions building.

References

External links
 http://www.reconnectwithnature.org/visitor-centers/mr

Reservoirs in Illinois
Protected areas of Will County, Illinois
Bodies of water of Will County, Illinois